Pterogramma is a genus of flies belonging to the family of the Lesser Dung flies.

Species
P. adustum Smith & Marshall, 2004
P. aestivale (Richards, 1973)
P. ancora Smith & Marshall, 2004
P. annectens (Richards, 1964)
P. aquatile Smith & Marshall, 2004
P. atronaricum Smith & Marshall, 2004
P. brevivenosum (Tenorio, 1967)
P. cardisomi Norrbom & Kim in Norrbom, Kim & Fee, 1984
P. conicum (Richards, 1946)
P. costaphiletrix Smith & Marshall, 2004
P. deemingi (Richards, 1973)
P. flaviceps Smith & Marshall, 2004
P. gilviventre Smith & Marshall, 2004
P. inconspicuum (Malloch, 1914)
P. infernaceps Smith & Marshall, 2004
P. insulare Papp, 1972
P. jubar Smith & Marshall, 2004
P. lobosternum Smith & Marshall, 2004
P. luridobregma Smith & Marshall, 2004
P. luxor (Spuler, 1925)
P. madare (Spuler, 1925)
P. meridionale (Malloch, 1914)
P. monticola (Malloch, 1914)
P. morretense Smith & Marshall, 2004
P. nexoverpa Smith & Marshall, 2004
P. nigrotibiale Smith & Marshall, 2004
P. ochrofrons Smith & Marshall, 2004
P. ovipenne (Duda, 1925)
P. palliceps (C. W. Johnson, 1915)
P. parameridionale (Duda, 1925)
P. poecilopterum (Malloch, 1914)
P. portalense Smith & Marshall, 2004
P. robustum (Spuler, 1925)
P. rutilans (Duda, 1925)
P. simplicicrus (Duda, 1925)
P. stictopenne Smith & Marshall, 2004
P. sublugubrinum (Malloch, 1912)
P. substitutum (Richards, 1961)
P. substriatum (Duda, 1925)
P. vittatum (Malloch, 1914)

References

Sphaeroceridae
Diptera of North America
Diptera of South America
Diptera of Asia
Diptera of Australasia
Sphaeroceroidea genera